Vicki Nelson-Dunbar was the defending champion but lost in the first round to Olga Tsarbopoulou.

Neige Dias won in the final 6–0, 6–7, 6–4 against Patricia Medrado.

Seeds
A champion seed is indicated in bold text while text in italics indicates the round in which that seed was eliminated.

  Isabel Cueto (second round)
  Bettina Fulco (semifinals)
  Christiane Jolissaint (second round)
  Laura Garrone (quarterfinals)
  Mercedes Paz (quarterfinals)
  Barbara Paulus (quarterfinals)
  Vicki Nelson-Dunbar (first round)
  Adriana Villagrán (first round)

Draw

References
 1987 Brasil Open Draw

Women's Singles
Singles